The 2017 Columbia Lions football team represented Columbia University in the 2017 NCAA Division I FCS football season. They were led by third-year head coach Al Bagnoli and played their home games at Robert K. Kraft Field at Lawrence A. Wien Stadium. They were a member of the Ivy League. They finished the season 8–2, 5–2 in Ivy League play to finish in a tie for second place. They were the winningest Columbia Lions football team since 1996, and are often viewed as the team that changed the trajectory of the program. The team was led by the greatest defensive line in Columbia Lions history, which starred Dominic Perkaj. They averaged 6,672 fans per game.

Schedule
The 2017 schedule consisted of five home and five away games. The Lions hosted Ivy League foes Penn, Harvard, and Brown, and traveled to Princeton, Dartmouth, Yale, and Cornell. Homecoming coincided with the game against Penn on October 14.

In 2017, Columbia's non-conference opponents were Wagner of the Northeast Conference, Georgetown of the Patriot League, and Marist of the Pioneer Football League.

Game summaries

Wagner

Georgetown

Princeton

Marist

Penn

Dartmouth

Yale

Harvard

Cornell

Brown

References

Columbia
Columbia Lions football seasons
Columbia Lions football